This is a list of Belgian football transfers for the 2009 summer transfer window. Only transfers involving a team from the Jupiler League are listed.

The summer transfer window opened on 1 July 2009, although some transfers took place prior to that date; The first non-free non-loan move was completed on 3 January 2009. Players without a club may join one at any time, regardless if during or between transfer windows. The transfer window ended on 31 August 2009, although a few completed transfers were only announced a few days later.

Sorted by date

January 2009

February 2009

March 2009

April 2009

May 2009

 1 MacDonald was on loan to Roeselare from West Bromwich Albion, now sold to Germinal Beerschot.

End of 2008-09 season
After the end of the 2008-09 season, several players have returned from loan to another club or did not have had their contracts extended. They are listed here when the date is otherwise not specified. For a list of transfers where the returned players are also mentioned, see.

June 2009

 2 The loan period of Grnčarov to Maccabi Petah Tikva ended, now sold to APOEL.
 3 Nikica Jelavić was already on loan to Rapid Wien, now sold.
 4 Jérémy Taravel was already on loan from Lille, now bought.
 5 The loan period of Hyland from Portsmouth ended. As his contract with Portsmouth had expired, he signed with Zulte Waregem.
 6 The loan period of Noukeu to KVSK United had ended, but a new loan deal for another season was negotiated by the  clubs.

July 2009

 7 The loan period of Phibel to FC Brussels had ended, but he was released and signed for Antwerp.

August 2009

September 2009

Sorted by team

Anderlecht

In:

Out:

Cercle Brugge

In:

Out:

Charleroi

In:

Out:

Club Brugge

In:

Out:

Racing Genk

In:

Out:

Gent

In:

Out:

Germinal Beerschot

In:

Out:

Kortrijk

In:

Out:

Lokeren

In:

Out:

Mechelen

In:

Out:

Mouscron

In:

Out:

Roeselare

In:

Out:

Sint-Truiden

In:

Out:

Standard Liège

In:

 

 

Out:

Westerlo

In:

Out:

Zulte Waregem

In:

Out:

References

External links 
 Transfert - Mercato juillet 2009 - Footgoal.net

Belgian
Transfers Summer
2009 Summer